Vadavannur is a village and gram panchayat near to Kollengode Town in the Palakkad District of Kerala, India.

Demographics 
At the 2001 India census, Vadavannur had a population of 16,378, comprising 8,021 males and 8,357 females.

References 

Villages in Palakkad district
Gram panchayats in Palakkad district